The 1987 VFL draft was the second draft to provide recruitment opportunities to clubs participating in Australian rules football's elite Victorian Football League. Held after the end of the 1987 season, it consisted only of the national draft itself.

National draft
The format of the second VFL draft was much the same as that for the inaugural draft held the previous year. In each of the five rounds, the 13 participating clubs (except West Coast, which instead received complete access to all West Australian footballers for the second year) all received one selection, the order of which was set in the reverse of the previous season's finishing positions. The minimum age for draftees was again 16, but Sydney was the only club allowed to draft players from New South Wales who were under the age of 19.

Meanwhile, in addition to being involved in the national draft, the Brisbane Bears also kept the sole recruitment rights for all players from Queensland, and although country zoning had now finished, Victorian clubs retained exclusive use of Metropolitan Zones.

Like the previous draft, some players did not join the club that selected them. Notably, South Australians Chris McDermott, Andrew Jarman and Simon Tregenza all chose to stay at home and later became part of Adelaide's inaugural AFL squad, with second pick overall McDermott becoming the first captain of the team. Meanwhile, Jamie Cox opted for a first class cricket career with Tasmania over signing for Essendon.

The first choice was heavyweight ruckman Richard Lounder, who only played four senior matches for Richmond and has been described as the most derided number one national draft pick. However, Richmond had more success with the second round pick, Brendon 'Benny' Gale, who became a firm favourite at the club during his 244-game career. Other 1987 draftees of note included Graham Wright of Collingwood and Melbourne's Stephen Tingay.

National draft selections

External links
Official AFL draft page

References

Australian Football League draft
Vfl Draft, 1987